The Drama Desk Award for Outstanding Music in a Play is an annual award presented by Drama Desk in recognition of achievements in the theatre among Broadway, Off Broadway and Off-Off Broadway productions. This category was not created until the 1980 ceremony and has only been regularly awarded since 2009.

Winners and nominees

1980s

1990s

2000s

2010s

2020s

See also
 Tony Award for Best Original Score

References

External links
 Drama Desk official website

Play Music